Henry Beaufoy (November 1750 – 17 May 1795) was a British Member of Parliament.

Life
Beaufoy was the son of a Quaker wine merchant; after marrying, he conformed to the Church of England. He was educated at Hoxton Academy and Warrington Academy, going on to Edinburgh University in the early 1770s. He was a founder of Hackney College. He was elected a Fellow of the Royal Society in February 1782.

Beaufoy was returned as Member of Parliament (MP) for Minehead (1783–1784) and Great Yarmouth from 1784  until his death. He was a staunch advocate of the repeal of the Test and Corporation Acts, which limited the civil rights of non-members of the Church of England. He voted for abolition of the slave trade on 18 April 1791, but on 25 April 1792 announced his conversion to gradual abolition, in the hope that ‘the conclusions of my understanding may ultimately correspond with the dictates of my heart’. He expressed his fear that ‘too precipitate a benevolence augmented, while it hoped to have diminished, the sum of human calamity’, claiming that a cessation of the trade must aggravate the plight of the existing slave population of the West Indies, and that if it spelt ruin for the planters, no other country would abolish the trade and thereby destroy its colonies. He chaired the committees' of the House which on 1 May 1792 reported in favour of gradual abolition. The 1792 Slave Trade Bill passed the House of Commons mangled and mutilated by the modifications and amendments of Pitt, it lay for years, in the House of Lords. Biographer William Hague considers the unfinished abolition of the slave trade to be Pitt's greatest failure.

He was Secretary to the Board of Control in 1791–1793. He was a witness in John Horne Tooke's trial for high treason in 1794.

Beaufoy was buried in St Mary's, Ealing. He had married  in 1778 Elizabeth Jenks, daughter of William Jenks of Shifnal: they had no children.

References

Sources
 

1750 births
1795 deaths
Members of the Parliament of Great Britain for English constituencies
British MPs 1780–1784
British MPs 1784–1790
British MPs 1790–1796
Fellows of the Royal Society